is a Japanese actor who is represented by the talent agency From First Production. He graduated from Shimonoseki Commercial High School and dropped out from Chuo University's Faculty of Letters.

Biography
In 1975, Yamashita was admitted to the Bungakuza's acting school. After graduating he joined Troupe NLT. During that time, he had a part-time job in a disco in Roppongi. Yamashita's television debut was as a sneaker-wearing detective in the television series Taiyō ni Hoero! in 1979.

His first lead role was a passionate teacher in School Wars: Hero which became a hit.

Yamashita was later a reporter in the cooking travelogue program Kuishinbō! Banzai and had the longest run in that role until it was broken by Shuzo Matsuoka.

On January 19, 2014, he was the oldest actor to play a Super Sentai ranger as Kyoryu Silver in Zyuden Sentai Kyoryuger.

Filmography

TV series

Films

References

External links
 Official profile 

Japanese male actors
1951 births
Living people
People from Shimonoseki
People from Yamaguchi Prefecture